Dariusz Jabłoński (born 30 May 1961) is a Polish film director and producer, president of his own production company, Apple Film Productions, and one of the leading independent producers in Poland.

Biography 

Jabłoński is a graduate of the Film Directing Academy in Łódź, Poland. He has worked on the biggest films in Polish cinematography – as a Second Director on Dekalog by Krzysztof Kieślowski and as First Assistant Director on the "White Visiting Card" and "Magnate" by Filip Bajon. He produced and directed "The Visit of an Elderly Lady" (1986) – the first Polish  independent film—and Photographer (1998), which received a number of international film awards: Grand Prix FIPA D'OR and Prix Planete in Biarritz (1999); Grand Prix VPRO Joris Ivens Award at IDFA in Amsterdam (1998); Prix Europa for Best Non-fiction TV Program (1998); Best Documentary in Banff (1999); Best Documentary at Double Take, Durham; Grimme Prize in Germany (2000); Bavarian TV Prize (1999). His work has also been screened at the TOP TEN Mediaforum Conference in Cologne. In addition, he has won awards at many international and Polish film festivals.

In 1990 he founded Apple Film Productions, which has produced more than 21 documentaries, 15 feature films and numerous tele-plays. Most of these were co-produced by Polish Television, Canal+, WDR, ARTE as well as other international producers.  Additionally, many of these productions have received myriad international film awards.

Jabłoński is a founder of the Polish Film Awards and the Polish Film Academy as well as of the Independent Film Foundation, created to promote Art House films and their writers. The Independent Film Foundation is also running "ScripTeast", an innovative training program designed specifically for experienced scriptwriters from Eastern and Central Europe. He has finished many special courses (ex. European Film College) and received many international scholarships for European film professionals.

He is also a member of the European Film Academy. In 2012 he was elected president of the Polish Film Academy.

He was a BBC candidate for the producer of the series about Rittmeister Pilecki.

Filmography

Writer 
2008 – War Games
1998 – Photographer
1992 – Mondo Migliore
1989 – Elegy for a Lady

Director 
2019 – The Pleasure Principle - series of 10 Episodes ( available on Arte.tv in polish french and german ) 
2008 – War Games
2007 – Strawberry Wine
1998 – Photographer
1994 – Meeting
1992 – Artur Brauner
1992 – Mondo migliore
1990 – Better World
1990 – Last Shabbes Goy
1989 – Elegy for a lady
1985 – Jóźko
1985 – Help

Actor 
1988 – Dekalog: Seven (Wojtek's Friend)

Producer 
2012 –         Aftermath
2009 –         Janosik. True story
2007 –  	Strawberry Wine
2005–2007 –  	Codzienna 2 m. 3 (TV series)
2005 –  	Solidarity, Solidarity...
2004 –         My Father, My Wife and My Lover
2003–2008 –  	The Cop (TV series)
2003 –         Saved by Miracle
2002 –         My Fried Chicken
2001 – 	The Spring To Come
2001 – 	Bellissima
2001 – 	Dated 20th Century
2000 – 	Sucker Season
2000 –  	Reed Dance
1999 – 	I'm Looking at You, Mary
1999 – 	The Gateway of Europe
1998 – 	Photographer
1998 –         Sekal Has to Die
1998 –  	The Auricle
1996 –         The Dogs of Totalitarian Regime
1996 –         Department IV
1996 – 	Street Games
1994 –  	The Gardens of Tadeusz Reichstein
1994 –         Return
1994 –         Kieslowski meets Wenders
1993 – 	Hrabal
1992 –         Mondo migliore
1992 –         Artur Brauner
1991 – 	Repetition of Conrad
1986 – 	The Visit of the Old Lady

References

External links 
 
Dariusz Jablonski President of Apple Films filmneweurope.com
 Dariusz Jabłoński
 Dariusz Jabłoński filmography (in Polish)

Polish film producers
Living people
1961 births